German submarine U-3041 was a Type XXI U-boat (one of the "Elektroboote") of Nazi Germany's Kriegsmarine, built for service in World War II. She was ordered on 6 November 1943, and was laid down on 7 December 1944 at AG Weser, Bremen as yard number 1200. She was launched on 13 February 1945, and commissioned under the command of Oberleutnant zur See Joachim Vieth on 10 March 1945.

Design
Like all Type XXI U-boats, U-3041 had a displacement of  when at the surface and  while submerged. The submarine was powered by two MAN SE supercharged six-cylinder M6V40/46KBB diesel engines each providing , two Siemens-Schuckert GU365/30 double-acting electric motors each providing , and two Siemens-Schuckert silent running GV232/28 electric motors each providing .

U-3041 was fitted with six  torpedo tubes in the bow and four  C/30 anti-aircraft guns. She could carry twenty-three torpedoes or seventeen torpedoes and twelve mines. The complement was five officers and fifty-two men.

Service history
On 9 May 1945, U-3041 surrendered at Horten, Norway. She was later transferred to Oslo on 18 May 1945, then to Lisahally, Northern Ireland on 3 June 1945, arriving on 7 June 1945.

Post war service
The Tripartite Naval Commission allocated U-3041 to the Soviet Union. On 10 December 1945, she arrived in Liepāja, Soviet-occupied Latvia, as British N-class N29. On 13 February 1946, the Soviet Navy allocated her to the Baltic Fleet. She was renamed B-29 on 9 June 1949 then sent to the reserve fleet on 29 December 1955. B-29 was redesignated on 18 January 1956, as a floating submarine battery recharging station PZS-31. She was finally struck from the Soviet Navy on 25 September 1958, and broken up for scrap.

References

Bibliography

External links
 

Type XXI submarines
U-boats commissioned in 1945
World War II submarines of Germany
1945 ships
Ships built in Bremen (state)